Kate Bashabe  is a Rwandan businesswoman and is the founder of Kabash brand and Kabash Cares organization  charity.

Early life and career 
In 2010, kate bashabe won miss mtn pageant and also became an ambassador for MTN in the same year. While completing her high school education, she was also juggling outsourcing her protocol services to several companies such as MTN, FERWACY  and corporate events.  In 2011, Bashabe became the country sales and marketing manager at RAK porcelain. after working for RAK porcelain for almost two years in 2012, she started her own imports company, where she imported goods such as cars, clothes, home supplies on behalf of customers. A few months later, she decided to follow her childhood dreams in fashion and opened Kabash Fashion House. In 2013, she expanded and put up a second business  where she focused on interior design , African craft and artwork, all under the Kabash label. Bashabe was invited to take part in an international exhibition event in the United States in 2016 by the Rwandan government as to promote Kabash brands overseas and expand her customer base.

After achieving success in her career, Bashabe decided to give back to her community. In 2017, she organized a charity event where local artists performed live going to fund impoverished children in Rwanda. The funds collected during the initiative were directed into supporting over 500 young Rwandan students. She then set up Kabash Cares in 2018. Kabash Cares is an initiative that sponsors needy students financially and materially.

References

Living people
Rwandan activists
People from Gasabo District
Year of birth missing (living people)